Offord is a surname, and may refer to:

 Cyril Offord (1908–2000), British mathematician
 Eddy Offord, record producer
 John Offord (died 1349), Archbishop of Canterbury
 Malcolm Offord, Scottish financier and politician
 Matthew Offord (born 1969), British politician (Conservative), MP for Hendon
 Willie Offord (born 1978), American football player (Minnesota Vikings)

See also
 The Offords
 Offord Cluny and Offord D'Arcy, which form The Offords
 Offord and Buckden railway station, a former station which served Buckden and The Offords
 Hofford